A Cross of Merit is a personal decoration which is generally above the rank of medal and below that of knight, and may refer to:

Germany
 Federal Cross of Merit

The Netherlands 
 Cross of Merit of the Order of the House of Orange
 Cross of Merit (Netherlands), a decoration for bravery
 Cross of Merit of the Netherlands Red Cross

Poland 
 Cross of Merit (Poland)
 Cross of Merit with Swords (Poland)
 Cross of Merit for Bravery (Poland)
 Cross of Merit (Polish Scouting and Guiding Association)

Ukraine 
 Cross of Merit (Ukrainian Insurgent Army)

Other
 Cross of Merit (EOHSJ)
 Cross of the Order pro Merito Melitensi, Sovereign Military Order of Malta

See also 
 Order of Merit (disambiguation)